Carse is a surname, and may refer to:

Adam Carse (1878–1958), British composer and musicologist
Bill Carse (1914–2000), Canadian ice hockey player
Bob Carse (1919–1999), Canadian ice hockey player
Duncan Carse (1913–2004), British explorer and actor 
A. Duncan Carse (1876–1938), British artist
James Alexander Carse (born 1958), Zimbabwean cricketer
James Howe Carse (ca. 1819–1900), British-Australian artist
James P. Carse, American academic
Matilda Carse (1835–1917), Irish-American businesswoman and social reformer 
Stef Carse (born 1965), Canadian pop singer

See also

Carle, surnames
Carle (given name)
Carré (surname)